"Get Up (I Feel Like Being a) Sex Machine" is a song recorded by James Brown with Bobby Byrd on backing vocals. Released as a two-part single in 1970, it was a no. 2 R&B hit and reached no. 15 on the Billboard Hot 100.

In 2004, "Sex Machine" was ranked number 326 on Rolling Stone magazine's list of the 500 greatest songs of all time. In the 2021 update of the list it had risen to 196.

Analysis
"Sex Machine" was one of the first songs Brown recorded with his new band, The J.B.'s. In comparison with Brown's 1960s solo funk hits such as "Papa's Got a Brand New Bag", the band's inexperienced horn section plays a relatively minor part. Instead, the song centers on the insistent riff played by brothers Bootsy and Catfish Collins on bass and guitar and Jabo Starks on drums, along with the call and response interplay between Brown and Byrd's vocals, which consist mostly of exhortations to "get up / stay on the scene / like a sex machine". During the song's final vocal passages Brown and Byrd started to sing the main hook of Elmore James' blues classic "Shake Your Moneymaker."

The original single version of "Sex Machine"—recorded, like many of Brown's hits, in just two takes—begins with a spoken dialogue between Brown and his band which was recreated with minor variations in live performances:

Fellas, I'm ready to get up and do my thing! (Yeah! That's right! Do it!) I want to get into it, man, you know? (Go ahead! Yeah!) Like a, like a sex machine, man, (Yeah!) movin', groovin', doin' it, y'know? (Yeah!) Can I count it off? (Okay! Alright!) One, two, three, four!

Personnel
 James Brown – lead vocal, piano

with The J.B.'s:
 Clayton "Chicken" Gunnells – trumpet
 Darryl "Hassan" Jamison – trumpet
 Robert McCollough – tenor saxophone
 Bobby Byrd – Hammond organ, vocal
 Phelps "Catfish" Collins – guitar
 William "Bootsy" Collins – bass guitar
 John "Jabo" Starks – drums

Chart positions

Other recordings

Brown would go on to re-record "Sex Machine" several times in addition to the original single version:
One was made in 1970 for his ostensibly all-live Sex Machine album. It is over 10 minutes long and includes added reverb and overdubbed audience noise intended to conceal its studio origins. (A version of this recording without overdubs appears on the 1996 compilation Funk Power 1970: A Brand New Thang.) 
Another, which was released in 1975, features a new instrumental arrangement and lyrics aimed at disco audiences. Nearly 12 minutes long, it was released as a two-part single and appeared on the album Sex Machine Today. Though it was poorly reviewed — Robert Christgau wrote that "if you own another version of 'Sex Machine' you own a better one" — it charted no. 16 on the R&B charts.
In 1993, Brown sang another version that was released in collaboration with his sponsorship of Nissin's Miso Soup.

"Sex Machine" remained a staple of Brown's concert repertoire until the end of his career. Live performances of the song appear on the albums Revolution of the Mind: Live at the Apollo, Volume III (1971), Hot on the One (1980), Live in New York (1981), Love, Power, Peace: Live at the Olympia, Paris, 1971 (1992), and Live at the Apollo 1995.

References

External links
Song Review at AllMusic
List of songs that sample "Sex Machine"

1970 songs
1970 singles
James Brown songs
The Flying Lizards songs
King Records (United States) singles
Polydor Records singles
Songs written by James Brown
Songs written by Bobby Byrd